The West Coast Conference men's basketball tournament is the annual concluding tournament for the NCAA college basketball in the West Coast Conference (WCC). The winner of the tournament each year is guaranteed a place in the NCAA Division I men's basketball tournament for that season.  Through 2008, the tournament was played on a rotating basis at the home courts of member teams. The 2009 edition was the first played at a neutral site, namely Orleans Arena in Paradise, Nevada, just outside Las Vegas. The semifinals are broadcast nationally on ESPN2 and the championship is broadcast nationally on ESPN.

The tournament has used several formats in its history, though seeding in all formats has been based strictly on conference record (with tiebreakers used as needed). When the tournament began in 1987, when the conference had eight members, it used a standard single-elimination bracket that was reseeded after the first round so that the highest and lowest remaining seeds played one another in the semifinals. Beginning in 2003, the bottom four seeds played first-round games (5 vs. 8, 6 vs. 7), with the 3 and 4 seeds receiving byes to the quarterfinals and the top two seeds receiving byes to the semifinals. For the 2012 tournament, the first after the 2011 arrival of BYU in the WCC, this format was adjusted so that the 8 and 9 seeds played in the first round, with the winner joining the 5 through 7 seeds in the second round, and the top four seeds continuing to receive byes into the quarterfinals (3 and 4) or semifinals (1 and 2). In addition, reseeding was abolished, with the top seed automatically playing the winner of the quarterfinal game featuring the 4 seed and the 2 seed automatically playing the winner of the quarterfinal game featuring the 3 seed.

Beginning in 2014, the WCC adopted a new format to incorporate a tenth team (Pacific). The new format is a traditional 10-team tournament. Seeds 1-6 received a bye into the quarterfinals while 7 played 10 and 8 played 9 in the first round. The second round featured the winner of the 7/10 match playing the 2-seed while the winner of the 8/9 match played the 1 seed. The 3 seed played the 6 seed and the 4 seed played the 5 seed. In 2014, the first-round games aired on BYUtv Sports. The afternoon quarterfinal games aired on BYUtv, and the evening quarterfinals were on ESPN2. One semifinal aired on ESPN and the other on ESPN2, and the championship game was carried by ESPN.

For 2019 and beyond, the tournament returned to a format similar to that used from 2003–2011, with slight changes to the terminology used for the rounds prior to the semifinals. The 7 through 10 seeds play in what is now called the "opening round", the 5 and 6 seeds start play in the "second round", and the 3 and 4 seeds start in the "third round". The top two seeds receive byes into the semifinals. According to media reports, the major impetus for this and other changes to WCC basketball was the potential loss of Gonzaga to the Mountain West Conference after the 2017–18 season, which in the end did not happen.

List of finals

Results by team
As of March 9, 2021

Team win–loss records

As of March 7, 2023.

Championship game team win–loss records

Team head-to-head results

Championship game team head-to-head results

Results by seed
As of March 9, 2021

Seed win–loss records

Championship game seed win–loss records

Results by coach
As of March 9, 2021

Coach win–loss records

Championship game coach win–loss records

Broadcasters

Television

As previously mentioned, the 1990 tournament final was canceled following the on-court death of Loyola Marymount player Hank Gathers during the Lions' semifinal game against Portland. LMU was given the league's automatic bid to that year's NCAA tournament by virtue of its regular-season league championship

Radio

See also

 West Coast Conference women's basketball tournament

References

 
Recurring sporting events established in 1987
1987 establishments in California